Moorefield may refer to:

Places

United States
 Moorefield, Arkansas
 Moorefield, Indiana
 Moorefield, Kentucky
 Moorefield, Nebraska
 Moorefield, Ohio
 Moorefield, West Virginia
 Battle of Moorefield, on August 7, 1864 in the American Civil War

Republic of Ireland
 Moorefield, area of Newbridge, County Kildare
 Moorefield GAA, GAA club in Kildare

Canada
 Moorefield, a former local service district now part of the city of Miramichi, New Brunswick
 Moorefield, Ontario

Other uses
 Moorefield (system on chip), code name for an Intel Atom system on chip platform
 Virgil Moorefield (born 1956), drummer, composer and former student of Paul Lansky